Armorial of the House of Bernadotte is a list of coats of arms only of past kings and currently living royalty in the House of Bernadotte. Deceased princes and princesses are not included.

Royal House of Bernadotte

Bernadotte
Swedish heraldry